Glenea iwasakii is a species of beetle in the family Cerambycidae. It was described by Kono in 1933.

References

iwasakii
Beetles described in 1933